Steve Wegerle (born 15 May 1953) is a former professional soccer player who played as a winger.

Wegerle was born in Pretoria. He was voted Player of the Year is South Africa in 1974. He then joined Coventry City in 1975, but made no first team appearances. Steve Wegerle played 5 times for Feyenoord Rotterdam in 1975–76, finishing 2nd with Feyenoord in the Dutch competition, with 88 goals for and 40 goals against. His brother Geoffrey also played for Feyenoord Rotterdam in that 1975/1976 season. After June 1976, Steve Wegerle starred for the Tampa Bay Rowdies of the North American Soccer League for five seasons from 1977 to 1981. While with the Rowdies, Wegerle played in Soccer Bowl '78 and Soccer Bowl '79 (both defeats), as well as the 1979–80 NASL indoor finals, which Tampa Bay won. He joined the New York Cosmos during the 1981 season at age 28.  He played in Soccer Bowl '81 and '82 with the Cosmos, winning the latter.  Wegerle played 1983 with the Fort Lauderdale Strikers before returning in 1984 to finish his NASL career with the Rowdies.  Wegerle's 152 points in 196 career games ranks him as the league's 27th all-time leading scoring. His 88 assists rank him 4th in that category.

Wegerle played for the Rowdies during the 1986–1987 American Indoor Soccer Association season. He later played for the team in the American Soccer League in 1988 and 1989 and then in the American Professional Soccer League in 1990.

Wegerle is the father of Bryce Wegerle.  His brother Roy Wegerle is a former American international and MLS star, while his brother Geoff Wegerle played in the NASL for the 1978 season with Oakland and 1983 with Toronto.  Steve and Roy were on the Rowdies together in 1984. Steve and Geoff played together on the post-NASL Rowdies from 1986 to 1988. Steve's mother is Scottish and his father is German.

References

External links
Profile at Voetbal International
NASL stats

1953 births
Living people
Association football wingers
American Indoor Soccer Association players
American Professional Soccer League players
American Soccer League (1988–89) players
Arcadia Shepherds F.C. players
Eredivisie players
Expatriate footballers in the Netherlands
Expatriate soccer players in the United States
Feyenoord players
Fort Lauderdale Strikers (1977–1983) players
Leyland Motors F.C. players
Major Indoor Soccer League (1978–1992) players
North American Soccer League (1968–1984) indoor players
New York Cosmos players
North American Soccer League (1968–1984) players
Soccer players from Pretoria
South African expatriate soccer players
Tampa Bay Rowdies (1975–1993) players
South African soccer players
South Africa international soccer players
South African expatriate sportspeople in the Netherlands
South African expatriate sportspeople in the United States
White South African people
South African people of Scottish descent
South African people of German descent
Wichita Wings (MISL) players
National Football League (South Africa) players